Grandes may refer to:

Agustín Muñoz Grandes, Spanish general and politician
Banksia ser. Grandes, a series of plant species native to Australia
 Grandes y San Martín, a municipality located in the province of Ávila, Castile and León, Spain
Grandes (islands), a group of three small islands in the Aegean Sea off the east coast of Crete
Grandes (album), by Maná